Western Australian soccer clubs competed in 2021 for the Football West State Cup. Clubs entered from the National Premier Leagues WA, the two divisions of the State League, a limited number of teams from various divisions of the 2021 Amateur League, Metropolitan League and Masters League competitions, and from regional teams from the Goldfields, South West and Great Southern regions.

This knockout competition was won by Floreat Athena, their eighth title.

The competition also served as the Western Australian Preliminary Rounds for the 2021 FFA Cup. The two finalists – ECU Joondalup and Floreat Athena – qualified for the final rounds, entering at the Round of 32.

Format

Preliminary rounds

A total of 65 teams took part in the competition, from Perth-based and regional-based competitions.

Final
The 2021 State Cup Final was  played at the neutral venue of Inglewood Stadium. Floreat defender Ben Steele received the Player of the Match award.

References

Football West State Cup
WA State Cup